Highway 91 (AR 91, Ark. 91, and Hwy. 91) is a north–south state highway in the Upper Arkansas Delta. The route of  begins at US Highway 49 (US 49) and Highway 1 at Jonesboro and runs north to US 412 in Walnut Ridge. The route is maintained by the Arkansas State Highway and Transportation Department (AHTD).

Route description
AR 91 begins in northwest Jonesboro at US 63 BUS. The route runs west in a concurrency with AR 18 over US 63 as Dan Avenue. The concurrency continues west as Kings Highway until AR 18 turns south near Dryden. AR 91 meets AR 230 and AR 228 briefly in rural Lawrence County before again crossing US 63. The route continues north to cross US 67 (Future I-57) before terminating at US 412 in Walnut Ridge.

Major intersections

See also

 List of state highways in Arkansas

References

External links

091
Transportation in Craighead County, Arkansas
Transportation in Lawrence County, Arkansas
Jonesboro, Arkansas